Lyces cruciata is a moth of the family Notodontidae first described by Arthur Gardiner Butler in 1875. It is found in Costa Rica and Panama.

External links
Species page at the Tree of Life Web Project

Notodontidae
Moths described in 1875